The Volmer VJ-24W SunFun is an American high-wing, strut-braced, single-seat, pod-and-boom motor glider and ultralight aircraft that was designed by Volmer Jensen and provided as plans for amateur construction by his company Volmer Aircraft of Glendale, California.

Design and development
The SunFun started as a foot-launched glider design, the VJ-24, and was developed into a wheeled undercarriage motor glider, the VJ-24W. The VJ-24 was derived from the earlier Volmer VJ-23 Swingwing and differed from that design by replacing the wooden structure with metal and employing a constant chord, strut-braced wing in place of the VJ-23's cantilever, tapered wing.

The aircraft is built from aluminium tubing covered with aircraft fabric. The  span wing is braced by V-struts, supported by triangular jury struts. The fuselage is built around a keel tube that mounts the cruciform tail at the aft end, the wing and cockpit in the center and the engine at the front. The specified engines are the Yamaha KT100  go-kart powerplant and the  McCulloch MAC-101, mounted in tractor configuration on the front of the keel tube, above the aircraft's nose. The landing gear is of conventional configuration, using spoked bicycle wheels for the main gear.

The take-off and landing distances with the  engine are both .

In 1998 plans cost US$100 and the estimated cost of the materials to build the VJ-24W were US$2400. The estimated construction time is 250 hours.

Variants
VJ-24
Unpowered three axis-controlled hang glider version, foot launched and landed.
VJ-24W
Powered version with wheeled landing gear.

Specifications (VJ-24W)

See also

References

External links

Photo of a VJ-24W Cockpit
Photo of a VJ-24W Tail
Photo of a VJ-24W

1970s United States sailplanes
Homebuilt aircraft
Sailplanes designed for foot-launching
Motor gliders
VJ-24
High-wing aircraft
1970s United States ultralight aircraft